Local elections was held in Antipolo on May 14, 2007, within the Philippine general election. The voters elected candidates for the elective local posts in the city: the mayor, vice mayor, the two district congressmen, two provincial board members of Rizal, one for each district, and the sixteen councilors, eight in each of the city's districts.

Background 
Incumbent Mayor Angelito "Lito" Gatlabayan was on his third and final term. He ran as representative of Second District. Incumbent Second District Representative Victor Sumulong ran for his place. Sumulong faced Gatlabayan's former opponent, Susana Garcia-Say.

Incumbent Vice Mayor Danilo Leyble ran for re-election.

Incumbent First District Representative Ronaldo "Ronnie" Puno was elected in 2004. In 2006, he resigned in office and appointed as Secretary of Department of the Interior and Local Government by President Gloria Macapagal-Arroyo. His seat left vacant until election. His brother, Roberto "Robbie" Puno ran for his place. Puno was challenged by Florante Quizon and Amarante Velasco Jr.

Incumbent Second District Representative Victor "Vic" Sumulong won't ran for re-election. Incumbent Mayor Angelito "Lito" Gatlabayan ran for his place instead. Gatlabayan was challenged by Vice Governor Anthony Jesus "Jestoni" Alarcon.

Results

For Mayor 
Victor Sumulong won the election.

For Vice Mayor 
Danilo Leyble was re-elected.

For Representative

First District 
Roberto "Robbie" Puno won the election

Second District 
Angelito "Lito" Gatlabayan won the election.

For City Councilors

First District

Second District

Note 
Mayor Victor Sumulong died in office on January 6, 2009. Vice Mayor Danilo Leyble took in-charge as Acting Mayor and Second District Councilor Lorenzo Zapanta as Acting Vice Mayor.

References

External links 
 

Politics of Antipolo
2007 Philippine local elections
Elections in Antipolo
2007 elections in Calabarzon